Vowpal Wabbit (VW) is an open-source fast online interactive machine learning system library and program developed originally at Yahoo! Research, and currently at Microsoft Research. It was started and is led by John Langford. Vowpal Wabbit's interactive learning support is particularly notable including Contextual Bandits, Active Learning, and forms of guided Reinforcement Learning. Vowpal Wabbit provides an efficient scalable out-of-core implementation with support for a number of machine learning reductions, importance weighting, and a selection of different loss functions and optimization algorithms.

Notable features
The VW program supports:

 Multiple supervised (and semi-supervised) learning problems:
 Classification (both binary and multi-class)
 Regression
 Active learning (partially labeled data) for both regression and classification
 Multiple learning algorithms (model-types / representations)
 OLS regression
 Matrix factorization (sparse matrix SVD)
 Single layer neural net (with user specified hidden layer node count)
 Searn (Search and Learn)
 Latent Dirichlet Allocation (LDA)
 Stagewise polynomial approximation
 Recommend top-K out of N
 One-against-all (OAA) and cost-sensitive OAA reduction for multi-class
 Weighted all pairs
 Contextual-bandit (with multiple exploration/exploitation strategies)
 Multiple loss functions:
 squared error
 quantile
 hinge
 logistic
 poisson
 Multiple optimization algorithms
 Stochastic gradient descent (SGD)
 BFGS
 Conjugate gradient
 Regularization (L1 norm, L2 norm, & elastic net regularization)
 Flexible input - input features may be:
 Binary
 Numerical
 Categorical (via flexible feature-naming and the hash trick)
 Can deal with missing values/sparse-features
 Other features
 On the fly generation of feature interactions (quadratic and cubic)
 On the fly generation of N-grams with optional skips (useful for word/language data-sets)
 Automatic test-set holdout and early termination on multiple passes
 bootstrapping
 User settable online learning progress report + auditing of the model
 Hyperparameter optimization

Scalability
Vowpal wabbit has been used to learn a tera-feature (1012) data-set on 1000 nodes in one hour. Its scalability is aided by several factors:
 Out-of-core online learning: no need to load all data into memory
 The hashing trick: feature identities are converted to a weight index via a hash (uses 32-bit MurmurHash3)
 Exploiting multi-core CPUs: parsing of input and learning are done in separate threads.   
 Compiled C++ code

References

External links

 
 Vowpal Wabbit's github repository
 Documentation and examples (github wiki)
 Vowpal Wabbit Tutorial at NIPS 2011
 Questions (and answers) tagged 'vowpalwabbit' on StackOverflow

Data mining and machine learning software
Microsoft free software
Software using the BSD license
Yahoo! software